Andata e ritorno (English: Go and back) is a 1985 documentary film produced and directed by .
It is located in Pazzano, a small town in the province of Reggio Calabria, and was shot between November 1 and November 4, 1985.
Dialogues are in part in pazzanese dialect with Italian subtitles, and in part in Italian.

Broadcast 
The film was broadcast by TV on Raidue in June 1985.

Content 
The film focuses on Carlo Cuteri, a Calabrian boy who comes back to his Pazzano home town.
The documentary deals with the issues of work-related emigration and uses Pazzano as a symbol for general problems in Southern Italy.

Reception 
Claudio Stillitano, in an article on Oggisud in 1985, explored the debate created by the local reception of the film. Film maker Daniele Segre was accused of giving an unfairly dark image of Pazzano; to which he replied that his purpose had been to expose the problems of the South through Pazzano.

External links 
Andata e Ritorno on Danielesegre.it
E intanto a Pazzano un film ha causato un putiferio politico, article of Claudio Stillitano

Italian documentary films
Films set in Italy
1985 films
1980s Italian films